Duane Pederson (September 1938 – July 20 2022) was an American Eastern Orthodox priest and former self-proclaimed "Jesus freak", and leader of the "Jesus movement".

Jesus movement 
In his capacity as founding editor of the Hollywood Free Paper, he was credited with coining the terms "Jesus people" and "Jesus movement". 

Pederson clarified in an audio interview that those words were attributed to him by a news agency when he said "We're people who love Jesus." However, Pederson did popularize the words "Jesus People" and "Jesus Movement" in the pages of the Hollywood Free Paper.

Priesthood 
Pederson joined the Antiochian Orthodox Church where he received Holy Orders as an Archimandrite. He was ordained as a priest in 1991.

Orthodox Prison Ministry 
In 1993, Metropolitan Philip, Primate of the Antiochian Archdiocese of North America, asked Pederson, an experienced prison minister, to establish a prison ministry for the Archdiocese. 

In 2005, Philip offered the Archdiocese’s prison ministry to the Standing Conference of the Canonical Orthodox Bishops in the Americas (SCOBA). Shortly thereafter, Orthodox Christian Prison Ministry (OCPM) was chartered by SCOBA as its official prison ministry.

Publications 
In 2009, Pederson edited a 35th anniversary edition of the Hollywood Free Paper.

Pederson wrote Larger Than Ourselves: The Early Beginnings of the Jesus People, (Hollywood CA: Hollywood Free Paper, 2014). In the book, Pederson recounted some of the earliest stories of how the Jesus People movement began and includes pictures of key figures and places throughout the early years of the movement.

Later life and death 
Later semiretired, Pederson ministered to prisoners and those on the street, through homeless shelters, as well as serving various parishes in Southern California and Minnesota of the Antiochian Orthodox Church.

Pederson died in July 2022.

See also 
 Evangelical Orthodox Church

References

External links 
 Hollywood Free Paper
 Leaders of the Jesus Movement
 Orthodox Christian Prison Ministry
 Pederson's sermons
 St. Matthew's Orthodox Church

1938 births
2022 deaths
21st-century Eastern Orthodox priests
American Eastern Orthodox priests
American Pentecostals
Converts to Eastern Orthodoxy from Protestantism
Former Pentecostals
Jesus movement
Members of the Greek Orthodox Church of Antioch